Glogovac (Serbian Cyrillic: Глоговац ) is a village in Serbia. It is situated in the Bogatić municipality, in the Mačva District. The village has a Serb ethnic majority and its population numbering 967 people (2002 census).

See also
List of places in Serbia
Mačva

Mačva
Populated places in Mačva District